El último show is a Spanish television series starring Miguel Ángel Tirado (Marianico el Corto) created by Álex Rodrigo, the first original fiction series produced by Aragón TV. It originally aired in 2020.

Premise 
Set in Aragon, the fiction is approached as a tragedy blended with comedy elements. A formerly popular comedian, Miguel Ángel, aka "Marianico el Corto", suffers from an identity crisis after finding out that his jokes are no longer funny. Despite his manager Chusé's intentions to return him back to stardom, he realises that he has little time left and decides to make a surrealist film paying homage to Luis Buñuel. He also tries to return to his former wife Pilar, now in a relationship with the much younger Dámaso. Miguel Ángel's story runs parallel to the developments in the teenage years of his granddaughter Claudia.

Cast 
 Miguel Ángel Tirado, Marianico el Corto as Miguel Ángel, a fictional version of himself.
 Laura Boudet as Claudia, Miguel Ángel's granddaughter.
 Luisa Gavasa as Pilar, Miguel Ángel's former wife.
  as Marisa, Pilar and Miguel Ángel's daughter.
 José Luis Esteban as Chusé, Miguél Ángel's manager.
 Pablo Lagartos as Jacinto, Miguel Ángel's biggest fan.
 Denis Cicholewski as Traian, Claudia's classmate.
 Ken Appledorn as Max, English-language teacher.
 Laura Gómez Lacueva as Laura, an art dealer.
  as Dámaso, Pilar's younger boyfriend.
 María Isabel Díaz as Luz, Marisa's co-worker.
 Rubén Martínez as Fernando, Claudia's father and Marisa's former husband.
With the special collaboration of
 Álvaro Morte as Álvaro Morte.
 José Lifante as Luis Buñuel.
 Carlota Callén as Lorena.

Production and release 
Created by Álex Rodrigo, El último show was the first original fiction series produced by Aragón TV. It was directed by Rodrigo together with Carlos Val, whereas the screenplay was co-written by Rodrigo himself with Sara Alquézar and Enrique Lojo. Mario López worked as cinematography director. Zaza Ceballos,  Álex Rodrigo, Jaime Fontán and Silvia Gómez Jordana were credited as executive producers. Shooting fully took place in Zaragoza during the northern hemisphere Fall of 2019. The series consists of 8 episodes featuring a running time of around 50 minutes.

Originally broadcast by Aragón TV, the series premiered on 20 February 2020 in the Aragon region, earning 116,000 average viewers and a 23.1% audience share in the first episode, leading its time slot.

Awards and nominations 

|-
| align = "center" rowspan = "2" | 2021? || rowspan = "2" | 22nd Iris Awards || Best Screenplay || Álex Rodrigo, Sara Alquézar, Enrique Lojo ||  || rowspan = "2" align = "center" | 
|-
| Best Actor || Miguel Ángel Tirado ||  
|}

References 

Aragón TV
Television shows set in Aragon
2020 Spanish television series debuts
2020 Spanish television series endings
2020s Spanish drama television series
Spanish-language television shows
Television shows filmed in Spain
Television series about comedians